Karl Jochen Rindt (18 April 1942 – 5 September 1970) was a German-born racing driver who competed with an Austrian license during his career, despite having German and not Austrian citizenship. In , he was killed during practice for the Italian Grand Prix and became the only driver to be posthumously awarded the Formula One World Drivers' Championship.

Rindt started motor racing in 1961. Switching to single-seaters in 1963, he was successful in both Formula Junior and Formula Two. It was at Lotus that Rindt found a competitive car, although he was often concerned about the safety of the notoriously unreliable Lotus vehicles. He won his first Formula One race at the 1969 United States Grand Prix. He had a very successful 1970 season, mainly racing the revolutionary Lotus 72, and won five of the first nine races. In practice for the Italian Grand Prix at Monza, he spun into the guardrails after a failure on his car's brake shaft. Rindt was killed owing to severe throat injuries caused by his seat belt; he was pronounced dead while on the way to hospital. As his closest competitor Jacky Ickx was unable to score sufficient points in the remaining races of the season, Rindt was awarded the World Championship posthumously. Rindt left behind his wife, Nina, and a daughter, Natasha.

Overall, he competed in 62 Grands Prix, winning six and achieving 13 podium finishes. He was also successful in sports car racing, winning the 1965 24 Hours of Le Mans paired with Masten Gregory in a Ferrari 250LM.

Rindt was a popular figure in Austria and his success resulted in increased interest in motorsport and Formula One in particular. He hosted a monthly television show titled Motorama and set up a successful exhibition of racing cars in Vienna. During his time in Formula One, he was involved alongside Jackie Stewart, in a campaign to improve safety in Formula One.

Early life and family
Jochen Rindt was born on 18 April 1942 in Mainz, Germany, to an Austrian mother and German father. His mother had been a successful tennis player in her youth and, like her father, studied law. Rindt's parents owned a spice mill in Mainz, which he later inherited. They were killed in a bombing raid in Hamburg during the Second World War when he was 15 months old, after which he was raised by his grandparents in Graz, Austria. Although his grandfather chose to retain Rindt's German citizenship, for his entire career he drove under an Austrian racing licence. In an interview, he described his heritage as a "terrible mixture" and, when asked if he felt more Austrian or German, said that he felt "like a European". Rindt had one half-brother, Uwe, through his mother.

Rindt's childhood friends and his brother described him as a "laddish child" who often performed tricks to amuse others. While on a skiing holiday, he broke his femoral neck, leading to several surgeries that left one leg  shorter than the other. As a result of this, Rindt limped slightly for the rest of his life. At the age of sixteen, he received a moped and started racing his friends on motocross tracks. His time in school was troubled and he was excluded from schools several times. He said:

His chances of obtaining a licence were put into further jeopardy because he had collected eight recorded misdemeanours with the police during his youth. In 1960, he received his first car, an old Volkswagen Beetle. His interest in motorsport greatly increased when he visited the 1961 German Grand Prix at the Nürburgring with school friends, including fellow future Formula One driver Helmut Marko.

Racing career

Beginnings
Rindt drove his first race at the Flugplatzrennen in 1961, in his grandmother's Simca Montlhéry. After missing the official application period, he only entered after a friendly high-ranking motorsport functionary from Graz intervened on his behalf. During the race, he was black flagged for his dangerous driving style and therefore disqualified; he did not immediately return to the pit lane as he was unaware of the regulations. Rindt entered several rallies with his Simca but did not achieve good results. It was only when he was provided with a race-prepared Alfa Romeo GT 1300 at cost price and with free servicing by a local dealer that he became more successful. In the Alfa Romeo, he achieved eight victories.

In 1963, Rindt switched to Formula Junior with the assistance of Kurt Bardi-Barry, a wealthy owner of a travel agency and one of Austria's leading drivers at the time; Barry gave him his one-year-old Cooper T67 and the two men formed a partnership, driving to races together. Rindt was fastest in practice for his first race in Vallelunga, a race won by Barry, and took victory in his second at Cesenatico. In the race, Rindt had taken advantage of an accident in the early stages. While most drivers slowed for the incoming ambulance, he raced ahead between the straw barriers and the parked medical vehicle to take the lead. At the time, he was notorious for his dangerous style, almost crashing into the spectators at a race in the streets of Budapest.

Formula Two

Rindt was highly successful in Formula Two racing, amassing a total of 29 victories. He once again entered the series in partnership with Barry, driving Brabham cars. The engines provided by Cosworth were slower and inconsistent in performance; Rindt responded to his reduced pace by declaring: "Then I just brake two metres later." He entered his first F2 race in April 1964 at the Preis von Wien at Aspern, retiring from both heats. The international motor racing world first took notice of him on 18 May 1964, when Rindt won the London Trophy race at the Crystal Palace circuit in a Brabham BT10 ahead of Graham Hill.

Like many other drivers at the time, Rindt continued to race in Formula Two races alongside his duties in Formula One; his last F2 appearance was the Festspielpreis der Salzburg in August 1970. In 1967, he dominated Formula Two, winning nine races in his Brabham BT23. As an experienced Formula One driver, he was graded "A", meaning his results did not count towards the championship, and the title went to Jacky Ickx. Still, his performances led him to be called "king of Formula 2" by the racing press. He had a long-standing relationship with Roy Winkelmann, and drove with his team until it closed at the end of 1969.

Sports cars

Along with single-seater racing, Rindt took up sports car racing in the mid-1960s. Rindt started at the 24 Hours of Le Mans a total of four times.

Rindt's best result came the following year at the 1965 24 Hours of Le Mans. Sharing the drive of a Ferrari 250LM with American Masten Gregory for the North American Racing Team, Rindt won the event. Neither driver was happy to race in a seemingly uncompetitive car. A 1998 article in Motor Sport stated that neither appeared to show much interest in the race, but instead it was "more a case of 'hope it breaks soon' so they could draw their money and split". At the start, the drivers had to run to their cars; Rindt entered with a forward roll that allowed him to get his foot on the throttle instantly and take an early lead. The pair experienced considerable trouble in the early part of the race; the car did not restart during Gregory's first pit stop. Later, the engine failed partially and Gregory brought the car into the pits on only six of twelve cylinders. At this point, Rindt had already changed back into his civilian clothes, expecting their race to be over. After thirty minutes of repairs, the car restarted and Rindt and Gregory agreed to drive the rest of the event "flat out", at full speed and with the accompanying risk. Rindt drove most of the night, advancing from 18th to third position by dawn. Gregory persuaded Rindt to let him drive the closing part of the race, suspecting that his young teammate might not drive moderately enough to nurse the car to the finish. Jacky Ickx later recalled that the two had driven "like maniacs". Even so, the car survived, handing the pair what Ickx called an "unexpected victory".

Later that year, Rindt drove, again in a Ferrari 250LM, at the 500 kilometre race at Zeltweg. He was able to win ahead of the better powered Ferrari of Mike Parkes owing to a special lever that manually activated the brake lights. Using the tool shortly before his actual braking point, Rindt was able to force Parkes to brake earlier than him which allowed him to stay ahead.

Apart from his 1965 victory, he never finished the race in Le Mans. In 1966, his Ford GT40 (shared with Innes Ireland) suffered an engine failure. A year later, he drove a Porsche 907 with Gerhard Mitter until their camshaft failed.

Formula One

Cooper and Brabham (1964–1968)
Rindt made his Formula One debut at his home race, the 1964 Austrian Grand Prix, in a loaned Brabham BT11 supplied by the Rob Walker Racing Team. He retired on the 58th lap with a broken steering column in his only Grand Prix of the season.

For the 1965 Formula One season, Rindt signed as a permanent driver with Cooper, paired with Bruce McLaren. He was not immediately successful as Cooper, formerly a top team, were struggling at the time. In his first race, the 1965 South African Grand Prix, he developed transistor trouble; the damage was initially repaired but the problem recurred and Rindt had to retire from the race. His best result was a fourth place at the German Grand Prix at the Nürburgring. He ended the season with four points, 13th in the championship.

For , Cooper introduced the T81 chassis and used nine-year old Maserati V12 engines, which were powerful but heavy. A new engine formula was introduced for the season, with the capacity doubled to three litres. Many teams struggled with the new rules, leaving Cooper competitive even with their old Maserati V12s. After McLaren left, Rindt became team leader until  world champion John Surtees joined from Ferrari. In a race affected by heavy rain, he overtook Surtees for the lead on lap four. He spun several times on the wet track and suffered from a limited-slip differential, but held onto the lead until lap 21, when Surtees repassed him and won. It was Rindt's first ever podium finish in Formula One, after what Motor Sport magazine called a "very courageous" drive. Overall, he achieved three podium positions, handing him third place in the championship at the end of the year.

 was less successful, as Rindt only finished two races, the Belgian and Italian Grands Prix, both in fourth place. Six points meant that he ended the season in 13th place in the championship.

Technical problems restricted him that year. Brabham's Repco V8 engine was not competitive against the now widely used Cosworth DFV and Rindt finished just two races, both in third place. At the season opener in South Africa on New Year's Day, Rindt placed third, being elevated by a late retirement from Jackie Stewart and closing on second-placed Graham Hill towards the end. The race was won by Jim Clark, a close friend of Rindt's. It was Clark's final Formula One race; he died three months later at a Formula Two race at Hockenheim. Rindt was deeply affected by his death, telling Austrian journalist Heinz Prüller: "If Jim Clark is not safe, what can happen to us?" Rindt had closed on Hill in the latter stages of the race after the Englishman spun, and finished just four seconds behind after a close battle during the last lap. His eight points placed him twelfth in the championship at the end of the season.

During these years, he also raced in the Indianapolis 500 in both 1967 and 1968, but finished only 24th and 32nd, completing only five laps in 1968 after finishing slightly more than half of the 1967 race. In an interview in 2014, Heinz Prüller recalled Rindt speaking about Indianapolis in 1967: "In Indianapolis, I always feel like I am on my way to my own funeral." At another occasion, he said about the track: "It is catastrophic, I only drive there because of the money."

Team Lotus (1969–1970)

1969 season

For the 1969 season, Rindt signed for the 1968 World Constructors' Champion Lotus, where he joined the defending Drivers' Champion Graham Hill. Rindt felt uncomfortable with the move, owing to the notorious unreliability of the Lotus car; in a twenty-month period between 1967 and 1969, the team was involved in 31 accidents. Hill alone had nine crashes between 1968 and 1970, which led him to joke: "Every time I am being overtaken by my own wheel, I know I am in a Lotus." When Rindt joined Lotus, his friend and de facto manager Bernie Ecclestone, who had negotiated the deal, remarked that they were aware that Brabham may have been a better choice of team but the speed of the Lotus gave Rindt a chance to win the championship. Rindt commented: "At Lotus, I can either be world champion or die." Because of his uncertainty about the wisdom of joining the team, Rindt did not sign the Lotus contract until shortly before the 1969 Spanish Grand Prix.

Rindt's hesitancy appeared justified when both he and Hill suffered high speed crashes at the Spanish Grand Prix at Montjuïc. In both instances, the suspension mounted wings on the cars broke off, causing accidents that could have killed either driver. The effect of the failure lifted Rindt's car off the track and into the barriers, where it collided with the stationary car of Hill, whose accident occurred at the same spot. Although Rindt only suffered a broken nose, one marshal lost an eye and another had his foot broken. Rindt was furious with Lotus's team owner, Colin Chapman, over the failure; he told a reporter after the accident: "I place the blame on him [Chapman] and rightfully so, because he should have calculated that the wing would break." In an interview on Austrian television a day later, he said: "These wings are insanity [ein Wahnsinn] in my eyes and should not be allowed on racing cars. [...] But to get any wisdom into Colin Chapman's head is impossible." Asked whether he had lost trust in Lotus after the accident, he replied: "I never had any trust in Lotus", going on to describe his relationship with the team as "purely business".

Jackie Stewart later described Rindt's 1969 season as the year that he "came of age". At the end of the year, Motor Sport magazine called him "[t]he only driver to challenge Stewart seriously throughout the season", albeit placing only fourth in the championship. The poor reliability of the Lotus 49B affected him; he retired from seven races. The race was decided in Stewart's favour only when Rindt had to enter the pits after part of his car's bodywork started to rub on the tyre; he finished fourth. Having started from pole position, he traded the lead with Stewart and Piers Courage several times. During the last lap, Rindt, Stewart, McLaren, and Jean-Pierre Beltoise were running close together as they approached the finish line. Stewart took the win, only eight hundredths of a second ahead of Rindt, while fourth placed McLaren was also within two tenths of a second. It was the closest 1–2–3–4 finish in the history of the sport. Rindt recorded his maiden Grand Prix win at the penultimate race of the season at Watkins Glen, winning $50,000—the largest monetary prize in Formula One history at the time. His victory was overshadowed by a serious accident involving his teammate Hill, who crashed after a high speed puncture and suffered major leg injuries.

1970 season
For , Rindt's partner at Lotus was John Miles; Graham Hill had left the team to drive for Rob Walker's customer franchise. Rindt became the clear team leader. At the first Grand Prix of the season in South Africa, he qualified fourth, but eventually retired with an engine failure after a first lap incident with Chris Amon and Jack Brabham, the latter of whom went on to win for the final time in his career. Instead of one conventional front radiator, the Lotus 72 featured two, one on each side of the cockpit. Further innovations included torsion bar suspension in place of the widely used coil-springs, and all four brakes mounted inboard to reduce unsprung weight. During its first practice session, the left semi-axle of the car broke, sending Rindt into a spin. The car also proved ineffective in the race; Rindt retired after nine laps.

As the Lotus 72 was not as effective as the team hoped, it was returned to the factory to be re-built and Rindt used the old Lotus 49 for the next race in Monaco. The necessity of using tyres intended for the new design made the older car unstable. Seemingly unaffected by this, Rindt produced what his race engineer Herbie Blash called "the race of his life". From eighth on the grid, he worked his way through the field on a track notorious for presenting few overtaking opportunities. In the closing stages, he was second, steadily closing the gap on leader Jack Brabham. On the final lap, on the final corner, Brabham braked too late, touched the kerbstone and went straight ahead into the straw bales, allowing Rindt through to take his first victory of the season. He had originally started practice in the remodelled 72, but the car came to a halt early in the session with a broken lower wishbone, forcing Rindt to switch cars once more. Despite engine troubles during the rest of practice, he managed to qualify on the front row, but later retired with another engine failure.

He set pole position in the final practice session, almost a quarter of a second ahead of his closest challenger, Stewart. Rindt went on to take his maiden victory in the Lotus 72, but it was not a joyful occasion for him; on lap 23, his close friend Piers Courage, with whom he had eaten dinner just the night before, died in a fiery crash. Rindt was heavily shaken by the loss of yet another fellow driver and contemplated retirement.

After the success at Zandvoort, Rindt gained confidence in the new Lotus 72, describing it as "the best racing car that exists at the moment". But he continued to have problems. He went back to using his open-front helmet, only to be hit in the face by a stone from another car, causing a deep cut on his right cheek. He also suffered a steering failure on his car. Furious over yet another mechanical problem, he stormed into the Lotus garage and yelled at Colin Chapman: "If this happens again and I survive, I will kill all of you!" Rindt was still able to win the race, taking the lead in the championship. Jacky Ickx established an early lead ahead of Brabham and Rindt, but when Ickx's transmission failed, Rindt seized the opportunity to pass Brabham for the lead. Brabham was then able to regain the top spot on lap 69 as Rindt missed a gear and looked the certain winner, only to repeat his misfortune of Monaco: on the last lap, he ran out of fuel, allowing Rindt to take his third win in a row. His victory was cast into doubt shortly after the race when Chief Scrutineer Cecil Mitchell found the rear aerofoil not at the regulated height. Rindt was provisionally disqualified, only to be reinstated as winner after three hours of deliberation.

The  was originally set to take place at its traditional venue, the Nürburgring. The Grand Prix Drivers' Association (GPDA), represented by Rindt and Graham Hill, demanded changes to the circuit to increase safety, including Armco barriers along the entire  of the Nordschleife. No agreement was reached and the Grand Prix moved to Hockenheim, where Rindt took his fourth victory in succession. The race was another two-way fight, this time between Rindt and Ickx, who exchanged the lead several times. He set the Lotus 72 on pole position, to the delight of the crowd, but retired from the race with an engine failure. The title decision was therefore postponed to the next race in Monza.

Death and legacy

Because of this, many teams, including Lotus, opted to drop the rear wings mounted on the cars to reduce drag and further increase speeds. The more powerful flat-12 Ferraris of Jacky Ickx and Clay Regazzoni had been up to  faster than the Lotus at the previous race in Austria. Rindt's teammate John Miles was unhappy with the wingless setup in Friday practice, reporting that the car "wouldn't run straight". Rindt reported no such problems, and Chapman recalled that Rindt reported the car to be "almost 800 rpm faster on the straight" without wings.

On his fifth lap of his practice session, he crashed heavily at the approach to the Parabolica corner. Denny Hulme, who was following Rindt at the time, described the accident as follows:

Upon impact, a joint in the crash barrier parted, the suspension of the vehicle went under the barrier, and the car hit a stanchion head-on. The front end was destroyed. Rindt was in the habit of using only four points on the five-point harness then available and did not wear the crotch straps, as he wanted to be able to exit the car quickly in the event of fire.  As a result, upon impact he slid under the belts, and the belts fatally slit open Rindt's throat. Later investigations found that the accident was initiated by a failure of the car's right front inboard brake shaft, but that Rindt's death was caused by poorly installed crash barriers.

Rindt was pronounced dead on the way to hospital in Milan and Lotus withdrew all cars from the race, including the Lotus 72 entered by Rob Walker. The Grand Prix went ahead and Clay Regazzoni took his maiden victory, but celebrations were muted. There was a lengthy investigation into Rindt's death in Italy, leading to a trial against Colin Chapman; he was cleared of all charges in 1976. The destroyed Lotus 72 remained in Italy after the trial, going to a scrapyard near Monza. In 1985, a real estate agent found the wreckage and bought it from the authorities, later trading it in 1993 for a Lola Formula 3 car. Since then, the car has rested in a garage near Milan.

Rindt was buried at the central cemetery (Zentralfriedhof) in Graz on 11 September 1970. At his funeral, Joakim Bonnier gave the eulogy, saying:

At the time he died Rindt had won five of that year's ten Grands Prix, which meant that he had a substantial lead in the Drivers' Championship. After winning the next race in Canada, Jacky Ickx moved within 17 points of Rindt in the Championship, giving him a chance to win the title if he won the two remaining races. The championship trophy was handed to his widow Nina by Jackie Stewart on 18 November 1970 in a ceremony near the Place de la Concorde in Paris.

Rindt was commemorated in many ways. The early season BARC 200 Formula Two race was renamed the Jochen Rindt Memorial Trophy for as long as the series existed. In 2000, on the 30th anniversary of his death, the city of Graz unveiled a bronze plaque in remembrance of Rindt, with wife Nina and daughter Natasha present. The penultimate corner at the Red Bull Ring in Austria is named after Rindt.

The Historic Sports Car Club in the United Kingdom hosts a historic Formula 2 championship, whose pre-1972 category is called the "Class A Jochen Rindt Trophy".

Personal life
In March 1967, Rindt married Nina Lincoln, a Finnish model and daughter of racing driver Curt Lincoln, whom he had raced in the early part of his career. After becoming engaged, Lincoln had originally broken up with Rindt and sent the engagement ring back. Rindt then put it back into the box with a note telling her to keep it until she changed her mind, which she did upon receiving the package, later explaining: "I like men who know what they want." The couple moved to Switzerland, near Begnins, where they built a house together. The Rindts had one daughter, Natasha, who was two years old at the time of her father's death. Nina Rindt married twice more after Rindt's death, first Philip Martyn, with whom she had another daughter, and then Alexander Hood, 4th Viscount Bridport, making her Nina Hood, Lady Bridport. The couple had a son, Anthony. Their daughter Natasha later worked with Bernie Ecclestone for several years after he had taken over the commercial rights of Formula One.

Rindt had met Bernie Ecclestone during his time at Cooper and the two became friends. Noticing his commercial talent, Rindt allowed Ecclestone to manage his professional contracts, without ever officially employing him as a manager. Ecclestone said of the relationship: "I was never his manager, we were good friends. I helped him with any help he ever needed." After Rindt's accident, it was Ecclestone who carried his bloody helmet back to the pit lane.

In Formula One, Rindt had several friendly relationships with other drivers, most notably Jackie Stewart. They met at a Formula Two event in 1964 and soon became friends, often going on holiday together and living near each other in Switzerland. Until his death, they were sometimes accompanied by Jim Clark. Rindt became involved in Stewart's fight for increased safety in Formula One, being one of the leading figures of the GPDA. For his role in the safety campaign, Rindt was criticised by fellow drivers and the press alike; reporters derogatively called Stewart, Rindt and Joakim Bonnier the "Geneva connection", due to their residence in Switzerland. Stewart said that it took Rindt some time to understand the graveness of the situation but after that, he was a "good ally". After Rindt's death, his wife Nina stayed close with the Stewarts and can be seen visiting them at the 1971 Monaco Grand Prix in the Roman Polanski-produced film Weekend of a Champion.

Privately, Rindt was known to family and friends as an often reckless driver when on public roads. During the early years of his career, he took his Jaguar E-Type out in the streets of Vienna, where he lived, and drifted through the streets. He sparked public criticism in 1968 when he flipped over a Mini Cooper during a demonstration run at an autocross event in Großhöflein, while his pregnant wife was on board.

Rindt's success popularised motorsport in Austria. Helmut Zwickl called him "the driving instructor of the nation". In 1965, Rindt put together the first exhibition of racing cars in Austria, the Jochen-Rindt-Show in Vienna. It was an immediate success, with 30,000 visitors on the first weekend alone. Using his connections, he brought in his friend Joakim Bonnier and former Mercedes Grand Prix manager Alfred Neubauer as opening speakers, with other drivers such as Jackie Stewart attending. The show soon became an annual event and later moved to the German city of Essen in 1970, shortly after Rindt's death, and remains there as the Essen Motor Show. Rindt, with the help of Ecclestone, was able to successfully promote himself, including lucrative sponsorship and advertising contracts. Following his ascent in racing, two race tracks were built in Austria, the Österreichring (now Red Bull Ring), for which Rindt worked as a consultant, and the Salzburgring. Rindt's popularity was further increased through the TV show Motorama, which he hosted. The monthly programme included tips for driving on public roads, reports from Grands Prix and interviews of fellow drivers by Rindt.

Racing record

Career summary

Complete Formula One World Championship results
(key) (Races in bold indicate pole position; races in italics indicate fastest lap)

Non-championship Formula One results
(key) (Races in bold indicate pole position)
(Races in italics indicate fastest lap)

Complete 24 Hours of Le Mans results

Complete Indianapolis 500 results

Notes
 – Until , not all points scored by a driver contributed to their final World Championship tally (see list of points scoring systems for more information). Numbers without parentheses are Championship points; numbers in parentheses are total points scored.

References

Film sources

Bibliography

External links

 created by his daughter Natasha Rindt
Report on Rindt on the official Formula One website

1942 births
1970 deaths
Austrian Formula One drivers
Formula One World Drivers' Champions
Formula One race winners
Rob Walker Racing Team Formula One drivers
Brabham Formula One drivers
Cooper Formula One drivers
Team Lotus Formula One drivers
24 Hours of Le Mans winning drivers
Indianapolis 500 drivers
Trans-Am Series drivers
Tasman Series drivers
World Sportscar Championship drivers
Sportspeople from Mainz
Racing drivers who died while racing
Sport deaths in Italy
Filmed deaths in motorsport
Racing drivers from Rhineland-Palatinate
Porsche Motorsports drivers